is a former Japanese football player.

Playing career
Yusuke Ishii played for Fujieda MYFC in 2014 season.

References

External links

1991 births
Living people
Ryutsu Keizai University alumni
Association football people from Kanagawa Prefecture
Japanese footballers
J3 League players
Fujieda MYFC players
Expatriate footballers in Cambodia
Association football forwards
Japanese expatriate sportspeople in Cambodia